Torontál was an administrative county (comitatus) of the Kingdom of Hungary. Its territory is now divided between Serbia and Romania, except for a small area which is part of Hungary. The capital of the county was Nagybecskerek, the current Zrenjanin.

Geography

Torontál county was located in the Banat region. From its recreation in 1779 until its partition in 1920 it shared borders with the Hungarian counties of Bács-Bodrog, Csongrád, Csanád, Arad and Temes.

The Banat Military Frontier lay along its southern border until it was abolished in 1873, after which the river Danube formed its southern border, which it shared with the Principality of Serbia (Kingdom of Serbia after 1882), and the Slavonian Military Frontier (Croatian-Slavonian county of Syrmia after 1881). 

The river Tisza formed its western border and the river Maros (Mureș) its northern border. The rivers Aranca, Bega, Timiș and Bârzava flowed through the county. Its area was  around 1910.

History

Torontál county was formed before the 15th century. Initially, the capital was at Aracs/Vranjevo (now a part of the town of Novi Bečej), and the county existed until this area was taken by the Ottoman Empire in 1552. During Ottoman administration, this territory was included into the Ottoman Province of Temeşvar. After Banat was captured by the Habsburg monarchy in 1718, the area was included into the Banat of Temeswar. This province was abolished in 1778 and it was incorporated into the Habsburg Kingdom of Hungary. Torontal county was restored in 1779, with significantly different borders than in medieval times. Its center was moved temporarily to Nagyszentmiklós (present-day Sânnicolau Mare) between 1807 and 1820 due to a great fire in Nagybecskerek (present-day Zrenjanin). 

In 1848/1849 the area of the county was claimed by the self-proclaimed Serbian Voivodship, while between 1849 and 1860 it was part of the Voivodeship of Serbia and Banat of Temeschwar, a separate Austrian crownland. After 1853, the county did not exist since the voivodeship was divided into districts. After the voivodeship was abolished in 1860, the area was reincorporated into the Habsburg Kingdom of Hungary and the county was recreated in January 1861. In 1876, when the administrative structure of the Kingdom of Hungary was changed, the borders of Torontal County were modified to include the District of Velika Kikinda. A few years prior, parts of the territory of the former Banat Military Frontier (including Pancsova/Pančevo, formerly the seat of the so-called German Regiment) had also been annexed to it.

In 1918, the county was briefly a part of the ephemeral Banat Republic, and then a part of Banat, Bačka and Baranja region of the Kingdom of Serbia, which subsequently became part of the newly formed Kingdom of Serbs, Croats and Slovenes. By the Treaty of Trianon of 1920, the area of the county was divided between the Kingdom of Serbs, Croats and Slovenes, Romania, and Hungary. Most of the county was assigned to the Kingdom of Serbs, Croats and Slovenes (which later became Yugoslavia). The north-eastern part of the county was assigned to Romania, and the northernmost part of the county (a small area south of Szeged, comprising Kiszombor and 8 surrounding villages) was assigned to Hungary and became part of the newly formed county of Csanád-Arad-Torontál in 1923.

The Yugoslav part of the pre-1920 Torontál county (the western Banat region) is now part of Serbia (mostly in the autonomous region of Vojvodina, except the small part near Belgrade, which is part of Belgrade Region). The Romanian part is now part of Timiș county (called Timiș-Torontal between 1919 and 1950). The Hungarian part is now part of Csongrád County.

Demographics

Subdivisions

In the early 20th century, the subdivisions of Torontál county were:

See also
Current North, Central and South Banat districts of Serbia

Notes

References

Sources

 
 
 
 

States and territories established in 1779
States and territories established in 1860
States and territories disestablished in 1552
States and territories disestablished in 1849
States and territories disestablished in 1920
States and territories disestablished in 1923
Counties in the Kingdom of Hungary
Vojvodina under Habsburg rule
History of Banat
Hungary under Habsburg rule